Keith Allred may refer to:

 Keith G. Allred (born 1964), 2010 Democratic nominee for Governor of Idaho
 Keith J. Allred, American lawyer in the United States Navy